Peter Spellos is an American voice actor.

Notable roles

Animated Television Series
  BattleTech: The Animated Series - Captain Miles Hawkins
  Bureau of Alien Detectors - Moose Trengganu

Anime
 Black Jack - Mr. Brane
 Bleach - Koganehiko, Dordonii Alessandro del Socaccio
 Code Geass - Bartley Asprius
 Cowboy Bebop - Dr. Baucus (Episode 15)
 Digimon: Digital Monsters - Meramon, Whamon, Additional Voices
 Eagle Riders - Cyberon
 El-Hazard - Londs
 Ghost in the Shell: Stand Alone Complex -  Niimi
 Gurren Lagann - Beastman (episode 13)
 Kikaider - Zadam
 Naruto - Hitode
 Outlaw Star - Gilliam
 Planetes - Hakim Ashmead
 Rave Master - Billy
 S-CRY-ed - Dred
 The Big O - Additional Voices
 Transformers: Robots in Disguise - Sky-Byte
 Trigun - Monev The Gale
 Wolf's Rain - Bartender

Live action
 American Dreams - Gus
 The Guyver - Ramsey
 ER -  Trib Reporter
 Married... with Children - Elmo
 NewsRadio - Camera Man
 Lois and Clark: The New Adventures of Superman - Elroy Sykes

Movie roles
 Billy Frankenstein - Bloodstone
 Bound - Lou
 Cowboy Bebop: The Movie - Duvchenko, Queen
 Digimon: Island of the Lost Digimon - Grizzlymon
 Dinosaur Island - Turbo
 Glass Trap - Howard Brunel
 Hard to Die - Orville Ketchum
 Men in Black II - Captain Larry Bridgewater
 Possessed by the Night - Big Ed
 Agent Red - Col. Korsky
 Sorority House Massacre II - Orville Ketchum
 In the Army Now - Mr. Quinn
 Yes Man - Security Guard (Hollywood Bowl)

Video games
 Seven Samurai 20XX - Rojie

References

External links
 
 

Living people
Place of birth missing (living people)
American male voice actors
Year of birth missing (living people)